Luttinen is a surname. Notable people with the surname include:

Arttu Luttinen (born 1983), Finnish professional ice hockey forward
Mika Luttinen, Finnish-born vocalist and lyricist